The 2017–18 Cypriot First Division was the 79th season of the Cypriot top-level football league. The season began on 19 August 2017 and is ended on 13 May 2018.

Teams

Promotion and relegation (pre-season)
Anagennisi Deryneia and AEZ Zakakiou were relegated at the end of the first-phase of the 2016–17 season after finishing in the bottom two places of the table. They were joined by Karmiotissa, who finished at the bottom of the second-phase relegation group.

The relegated teams were replaced by 2016–17 Second Division champions Alki Oroklini, runners-up Pafos FC and third-placed team Olympiakos Nicosia.

Stadiums and locations

Note: Table lists clubs in alphabetical order.

Personnel and kits 
Note: Flags indicate national team as has been defined under FIFA eligibility rules. Players and Managers may hold more than one non-FIFA nationality.

Managerial changes

Regular season

League table

Results

Positions by Round
The table lists the positions of teams after each week of matches. In order to preserve chronological progress, any postponed matches are not included in the round at which they were originally scheduled, but added to the full round they were played immediately afterwards. For example, if a match is scheduled for matchday 13, but then postponed and played between days 16 and 17, it will be added to the standings for day 16.

Championship round

Championship round table

Results

Positions by Round
The table lists the positions of teams after each week of matches.

Relegation round

Relegation round table

Results

Positions by Round
The table lists the positions of teams after each week of matches.

Season statistics

Top scorers

Hat-tricks

Scoring
First goal of the season: 73 minutes and 36 seconds –  Chafik Tigroudja (Alki) against Ethnikos (19 August 2017)
Fastest goal of the season: 0 minutes and 13 seconds –  Mickaël Poté (APOEL) against Anorthosis (20 December 2017)
Latest goal of the season: 97 minutes and 20 seconds –  Emilio Zelaya (Apollon) against Ermis (18 September 2017)
First scored penalty kick of the season: 81 minutes and 27 seconds –  Tiago Gomes (Doxa) against Ermis (27 August 2017)
First own goal of the season: 86 minutes and 25 seconds –  Kiriakos Stratilatis (Alki) for Anorthosis (27 August 2017)
Most goals scored in a match by one player: 3 goals
9 players
Most scored goals in a single fixture – 28 goals (Fixture 22)
Fixture 22 results: Olympiakos 1–2 AEL, Alki 3–4 Ermis, Omonia 5–1 Nea Salamina, Apollon 1–2 APOEL, Ethnikos 0–4 Aris, Pafos 0–1 Anorthosis, AEK 4–0 Doxa.
 Highest scoring game: 8 goals
Doxa 0–8 APOEL (14 January 2018)
APOEL 7–1 Ethnikos(6 February 2018)
 Largest winning margin: 8 goals
Doxa 0–8 APOEL (14 January 2018)
 Most goals scored in a match by a single team: 8 goals
Doxa 0–8 APOEL (14 January 2018)
 Most goals scored by a losing team: 3 goals
Alki 3–4 Ermis (30 January 2018)

Discipline
 First yellow card of the season: 26 minutes –  Jean-Baptiste Pierazzi for Alki against Ethnikos (19 August 2017)
 First red card of the season: 81 minutes –  Evariste Ngolok for Aris against Anorthosis (10 September 2017)
 Most yellow cards in a single match: 10
 APOEL 2–1 AEL – 3 for APOEL (Lorenzo Ebecilio, Agustín Farías, Mickaël Poté) and 7 for AEL (Fidelis Irhene, Vozinha, Marco Soares, Dani Benítez, Andreas Avraam, Marco Airosa, Mesca) (17 January 2018)
 Alki 3–3 Aris – 6 for Alki (Abdelaye Diakité, Yoann Tribeau, Willy Semedo, Jean-Baptiste Pierazzi, Fabrício Simões, Panagiotis Frageskou) and 4 for Aris (Edin Nuredinoski, Markos Maragoudakis, Vlatko Drobarov, Kyriakos Panagi) (17 September 2017)
 AEK 1–1 Apollon – 5 for AEK (Tete, Florian Taulemesse, Marios Antoniades, David Català, Daniel Mojsov) and 5 for Apollon (Héctor Yuste, Valentin Roberge, Esteban Sachetti, Allan, Emilio Zelaya) (5 November 2017)
 Omonia 5–1 Nea Salamina – 3 for Omonia (Hedwiges Maduro, Nicandro Breeveld, Demetris Christofi) and 7 for Nea Salamina (Andreas Karo, Anderson Correia, Carlão, Robert Veselovsky (2), David Poljanec, Taron Voskanyan) (30 January 2018)
 APOEL FC 2–1 Omonia – 3 for APOEL (Roland Sallai, Emilio Nsue, Lorenzo Ebecilio) and 7 for Omonia (Jaílson, Matt Derbyshire, Mamadu Candé, William Soares, Loukas Vyntra, Kanu, Theophilus Solomon) (17 February 2018)
 Apollon 5–1 AEL – 4 for Apollon (Alef, Esteban Sachetti, Fotios Papoulis, Anton Maglica) and 6 for AEL (Leandro Silva, David Texeira, Bogdan Mitrea, Dani Benítez, Marco Airosa, Kevin Lafrance) (3 March 2018)
 Most red cards in a single match: 2
 Pafos 0–1 AEL – 1 for Pafos (Dmitri Torbinski) and 1 for AEL (Kevin Lafrance) (14 January 2018)

References

External links

Cypriot First Division seasons
Cyprus
1